Manilla may refer to:

Manilla (money), the 'bracelet' currency of West Africa
 Manilla, New South Wales, Australia
Manilla River, a stream in New South Wales
 Manilla, Indiana, United States
 Manilla, Iowa, United States
 Manilla, Ontario, Canada
 Manilla, former name and now a common erroneous spelling of Manila, capital of the Philippines
 Manila paper

See also
 Manila (disambiguation)